Alisher Mukhtarov (born 26 May 1973) is a Uzbekistani judoka. He competed at the 1996 Summer Olympics and the 2000 Summer Olympics.

References

1973 births
Living people
Uzbekistani male judoka
Olympic judoka of Uzbekistan
Judoka at the 1996 Summer Olympics
Judoka at the 2000 Summer Olympics
Place of birth missing (living people)
Judoka at the 1998 Asian Games
Asian Games competitors for Uzbekistan